Phaedon, published in 1767, is a book by the Jewish Enlightenment philosopher Moses Mendelssohn, in which Mendelssohn offers a defense of immortality.

Summary

Phaedon is a defense of the simplicity and immortality of the soul.  It is a series of three dialogues, revisiting the Platonic dialogue Phaedo, in which Socrates argues for the immortality of the soul, in preparation for his own death. Many philosophers, including Plotinus, Descartes, and Leibniz, argue that the soul is simple, and that because simples cannot decompose they must be immortal. In the Phaedon, Mendelssohn addresses gaps in earlier versions of this argument (an argument that Kant calls the Achilles of Rationalist Psychology). The Phaedon contains an original argument for the simplicity of the soul, and also an original argument that simples cannot suddenly disappear. It contains further original arguments that the soul must retain its rational capacities as long as it exists.

Reception
Materialistic views were at the time rampant and fashionable, and faith in immortality was at a low ebb. At this favourable juncture appeared Phädon oder über die Unsterblichkeit der Seele (Phaedo or On the Immortality of Souls; 1767). Modelled on Plato's dialogue of the same name, Mendelssohn's work possessed some of the charm of its Greek exemplar and impressed the German world with its beauty and lucidity of style. The Phaedon was an immediate success, and besides being one of the most widely read books of its time in German it was speedily translated into several European languages, including English. The author was hailed as the "German Plato," or the "German Socrates"; royal and other aristocratic friends showered attentions on him, and it was said that "no stranger who came to Berlin failed to pay his personal respects to the German Socrates."

Immanuel Kant criticized Mendelssohn's argument for immortality in the second edition of the Critique of Pure Reason (1787), at B413–15. Commentators disagree over whether Kant's criticism is successful. Mendelssohn's arguments have been largely overlooked by contemporary analytic philosophers, but philosophers including Bertrand Russell and E.J. Lowe have offered arguments for the simplicity of the soul.

References

Bibliography
Books

 
 

1767 books
Immortality
Modern philosophical literature